The forest snakehead (Channa lucius) is a species of snakehead, a fish of the family Channidae. Its range includes most of Southeast Asia and parts of southern China. It lives in forest streams and can reach  in length. The forest snakehead is known in Thai language as  pla krasong. Khmer language called it កញ្ជនជៃ (kanh chon chey), Indonesians named it kehung, while in Malaysia, they called it ikan bujuk in Malay Language

A genetic study published in 2017 indicates that C. lucius is a species complex.

Description

It has a distinct series of port-hole markings on the side and has a more tapering head compared to other snakeheads. Juveniles are pale and have three lateral stripes from head to tail.

References

External links

 

Forest snakehead
Fish of Southeast Asia
Fish of Thailand
Fish described in 1831
Taxa named by Georges Cuvier